Edward "Bruno" Carr (February 9, 1928 – October 25, 1993) was an American jazz drummer. Carr was a frequent collaborator with Ray Charles, and he recorded with Aretha Franklin. He was Herbie Mann's drummer from 1965 through 1969.

Carr died of lung cancer in Denver, Colorado, at the age of 65.

Discography

With Curtis Amy
Mustang (Verve, 1967)
With Walter Davis Jr.
Illumination (Denon, 1989)
With Lou Donaldson
Cole Slaw (Argo, 1964)
With Aretha Franklin
Soul '69 (Atlantic, 1969)
With Herbie Mann
Herbie Mann Plays The Roar of the Greasepaint – The Smell of the Crowd (Atlaqntic, 1964)
Monday Night at the Village Gate (Atlantic, 1965)
Latin Mann (Columbia, 1965)
Standing Ovation at Newport (Atlantic, 1965)
Today! (Atlantic, 1965)
Our Mann Flute (Atlantic, 1966)
Impressions of the Middle East (Atlantic, 1966)
A Mann & a Woman (Atlantic, 1966) with Tamiko Jones
The Beat Goes On (Atlantic, 1967)
The Herbie Mann String Album (Atlantic, 1967)
The Wailing Dervishes (Atlantic, 1967)
Windows Opened (Atlantic, 1968)
The Inspiration I Feel (Atlantic, 1968)
Concerto Grosso in D Blues (Atlantic, 1968)
Live at the Whisky a Go Go (Atlantic, 1969)
Stone Flute (Atlantic, 1969)
Muscle Shoals Nitty Gritty (Embryo, 1969)
Memphis Two-Step (Embryo, 1970)
With Eddie "Cleanhead" Vinson
The "Clean" Machine (Muse, 1978)

References

External links 

1928 births
1993 deaths
20th-century American drummers
American male drummers
20th-century American male musicians